Zia Mohyeddin  (20 June 1931 – 13 February 2023) was a British-Pakistani film actor, producer, director, and television broadcaster who appeared in both Pakistani cinema and television, as well as in British cinema and television throughout his career. 

Mohyeddin became famous for his Pakistan Television talk show The Zia Mohyeddin Show (1969–1973). He was also known for originating the role of Dr. Aziz in the stage play of A Passage to India. He also appeared in Lawrence of Arabia.

Early life and career

Zia Mohyeddin was born in Lyallpur, British India (now Faisalabad, Pakistan), to an Urdu-speaking family originally from Rohtak, East Punjab, British India (now in Haryana, India). His father, Khadim Mohyeddin, was a mathematician, musicologist, playwright, and lyricist associated with various theatre groups.

Zia spent his early life in Lahore. He was trained at the Royal Academy of Dramatic Art in London from 1953 to 1955. After stage roles in Long Day's Journey into Night and Julius Caesar, he made his West End debut as Dr. Aziz in A Passage to India on 20 April  1960 at the Comedy Theatre. The production continued for 302 performances. He reprised this role in the 1965 BBC television adaptation as well. He made his film debut in Lawrence of Arabia (1962), playing the role of Tafas (the Arab guide who is shot by Omar Sharif for drinking water from the wrong well). He then made numerous TV and film appearances. As an actor, he worked for nearly 47 years in the United Kingdom.

His first wife was Sarwar Zemani with whom he had two sons, Minos Ameer and Risha Ameen.

Return to Pakistan and later career
Mohyeddin returned to Pakistan in the late 1960s. Between 1969 and 1973, he hosted the popular television talk show The Zia Mohyeddin Show, best remembered for Mohyeddin's rap-style song segment, which he would introduce with his trademark phrase of "zara theka lagaiye". He was also appointed director of the PIA Arts Academy. Around this time, he met and subsequently married the renowned Kathak dancer Nahid Siddiqui. Together they had a son, the percussionist and music producer, Hassan "Moyo" Mohyeddin.

Following differences with the military regime of General Zia-ul-Haq, Mohyeddin returned to the United Kingdom in the late 1970s. During the 1980s Mohyeddin worked in Birmingham, UK, where he produced Central Television's flagship multicultural programme Here and Now (1986–1989), a weekly magazine program. He also produced and starred in the first soap opera with a British Asian cast, Family Pride (1991–1992).

While working in Britain in the 1980s, he was asked in an interview by a Pakistani news reporter whether he missed Pakistan. He replied that he did, that it was his home country, and that he missed his friends there and the people of Pakistan.

Mohyeddin then travelled the world giving Urdu poetry and prose recitations, as well as readings of English letters and literature. As a matter of practice, he emphasised that the metric structure of the entire poem must be studied by the reciter. He commented unfavourably on reciters who would habitually pause after every rhyming couplet, or "hammer" out the verses without regard for rhythm. 

Mohyeddin married his third wife Azra Bano Zaidi in 1994. They had one daughter, Aaliya, who was born in 2002.

In February 2005, the then-president of Pakistan Pervez Musharraf invited Mohyeddin to form the National Academy of Performing Arts in Karachi, of which Mohyeddin was president since its inception.

Mohyeddin died on 13 February 2023, at the age of 91.

Films 
 Rahguzar (1960)
 Lawrence of Arabia (1962) – Tafas
 Sammy Going South (1963) – The Syrian
 Behold a Pale Horse (1964) – Luis, Guide of Paco
 Khartoum (1966) – Zobeir Pasha
 Deadlier Than the Male (1966) – King Fedra
 The Sailor from Gibraltar (1967) – Noori
 They Came from Beyond Space (1967) – Farge
 Work Is a Four-Letter Word (1968) – Dr. Aly Narayana
 Bombay Talkie (1970) – Hari
 Mujrim Kaun (1970)
 Ashanti (1979) – Djamil
 The Assam Garden (1985) – Mr. Lal
 Partition (1987)
 Immaculate Conception (1992) – Shehzada
 Some Lover to Some Beloved (documentary, 2017; Mohyeddin portrays himself)

Selected television appearances
 The Adventures of Sir Francis Drake (episode "Visit to Spain", 1962) – King Philip of Spain
 Danger Man (four episodes, 1964–1966) – Dr. Savari / Sinclair Jones / Mr. Sen / Khan 
 The Avengers (episode "Honey for the Prince", 1966) – Prince Ali
 Adam Adamant Lives! (episode "The Basardi Affair", 1967) – Sheikh Abdul
 Jackanory (story "The Bird Talisman", 1967) – Storyteller
 Man in a Suitcase (episode "Night Flight to Andorra", 1968) – Rafael
 The Champions (episode "Shadow of the Panther", 1969) – Prengo
 Hadleigh (episode "Some You Win Some You Lose", 1969) – Major Savvas Stylianos
 Detective (episode "Hunt the Peacock", 1969) – Inspector Ghote
 Gangsters (four episodes, 1978) – Iqbal Khan
 Z-Cars (episode "Heavenly Host", 1978) – Anwar Chowdry
 Minder (episode "Diamonds Are a Girl's Worst Enemy", 1980) – Tajvir
 Death of a Princess (1980) – Marwan Shaheen
 The Jewel in the Crown (1984) – Mohammad Ali 'Mak' Kasim
 Bergerac (episode "A Touch of Eastern Promise", 1984) – Adnan Rashid
 Family Pride (1991–92) – Balbir "BB" Bedi
 Dhun Hamari Tumharay Naam Hui (1990s)

Books 
 A Carrot is a Carrot: Memories and Reflections, Ushba Publishing, Karachi, 2008
 Theatrics, National Academy of Performing Arts, Karachi, 2012
 The God of My Idolatry: Memories and Reflections, Pakistan Publishing House, Karachi, 2016

Awards and recognition
Hilal-i-Imtiaz Award [(Crescent of Excellence) Award] in 2012 by the President of Pakistan
Sitara-i-Imtiaz Award [(Star of Excellence) Award] in 2003 by the Government of Pakistan
Lifetime Achievement Award on 29 November 2017, presented by the Pakistani community living in Dubai & given by the Pakistan Ambassador in United Arab Emirates (UAE).

See also 
 List of Lollywood actors

References

External links
 
 
 

1931 births
2023 deaths
Alumni of RADA
Pakistani dramatists and playwrights
Muhajir people
Recipients of Hilal-i-Imtiaz
Recipients of Sitara-i-Imtiaz
Pakistani male television actors
Pakistan Television Corporation people
Pakistani television talk show hosts
Pakistani emigrants to the United Kingdom
Naturalised citizens of the United Kingdom
British male television actors
British male film actors
British male stage actors
British dramatists and playwrights
Pakistani male film actors
Pakistani male stage actors
People from Faisalabad